Peter Tchernyshev (also romanized as Pyotr Andreyevich Chernyshev; born February 6, 1971) is a Russian-American ice dancer. With skating partner Naomi Lang, he is a two-time  Four Continents champion (2000 and 2002), a five-time U.S. national champion (1999–2003), and competed at the Winter Olympics in 2002.

Career

Early career
Tchernyshev began skating at the age of six because his parents felt it would be good for his health. He also studied ballet from the age of eight. He was originally a singles skater but injured his landing ankle at the age of 18 and it did not heal fully. He spent the next three years touring with the Russian All Stars in England and Turkey before returning to competition as an ice dancer.

Tchernyshev skated with Maria Anikanova in the late 1980s. He later competed with Olga Pershankova for Russia and the Soviet Union but he and his partner had problems and split up. After a girl arrived in Russia looking for a partner, he decided to move to the United States.

Tchernyshev competed with Sophie Eliazova for three years until they split in the summer of 1996.

Partnership with Naomi Lang
Having noticed Naomi Lang at U.S. Nationals, Tchernyshev wrote her a letter in mid-1996 asking for a tryout. They had a successful tryout in Lake Placid, New York and trained there for nine months with Natalia Dubova; then, due to Lang's homesickness, they moved to Detroit and began training with Igor Shpilband and Elizabeth Coates.

Lang/Tchernyshev first won the U.S. national title in 1999. The following season, they took gold at the 2000 Four Continents Championships and placed 8th at the 2000 World Championships. They also performed with Champions on Ice.

In 2000, Lang/Tchernyshev moved to Hackensack, New Jersey to train with Alexander Zhulin, who coached them until the end of the 2001–02 season. They missed their 2001 Grand Prix events because Tchernyshev had shin splits. Returning to competition, they won their fourth national title at the 2002 U.S. Championships and then won their second Four Continents title. They placed eleventh at the 2002 Winter Olympics and ninth at the 2002 World Championships.

In 2002–03, Lang/Tchernyshev were coached by Nikolai Morozov. After missing their 2002 Grand Prix events due to an injury to Lang, the duo won their fifth national title at the 2003 U.S. Championships, took bronze at the 2003 Four Continents, and placed 8th at the 2003 World Championships.

Lang/Tchernyshev did not appear internationally in the 2003–04 season. They intended to compete at the 2004 U.S. Championships but withdrew after Lang re-injured her Achilles tendon. They announced their competitive retirement in February 2004. The duo continued to skate together professionally and appeared in several U.S. ice shows, including many of the Disson skating shows televised on NBC and the Hallmark Channel. They also toured extensively in Europe and Russia.

Other work
Tchernyshev has done choreography for competitive skaters. He choreographed for Yuko Kavaguti / Alexander Smirnov (2011-2016 short and free program), Sinead Kerr / John Kerr (2010–2011 free dance), and Maia Shibutani / Alex Shibutani (2014-2015 exhibition and 2015-2016 free dance).

Personal life 
Peter Tchernyshev's grandfather, Pyotr Chernyshev, was a four-time Soviet champion in singles skating in the late 1930s.

Tchernyshev became a U.S. citizen in January 2001. He lived in the United States for about 15 years and currently lives in Russia. He was formerly married to Natalia Annenko. In October 2008, Tchernyshev married Russian actress Anastasia Zavorotnyuk. The wedding ceremony took place in the Foros Church, Crimea, Ukraine. In 2019 his wife A. Zavorotnyuk was diagnosed with brain cancer.

Programs 
(with Lang)

Results

With Naomi Lang

Earlier partnerships 
(with Sophia Eliazova)

(with Olga Pershankova)

References

External links 

 Official site
 
 Care to Ice Dance? - Lang & Tchernyshev

Navigation 

1971 births
Figure skaters from Saint Petersburg
American male ice dancers
Russian emigrants to the United States
Russian male ice dancers
Olympic figure skaters of the United States
Figure skaters at the 2002 Winter Olympics
Living people
Four Continents Figure Skating Championships medalists